The BMW Nazca C2 (also known as Italdesign Nazca C2) is a concept sports car introduced at the 1991 Tokyo Motor Show. The car was designed by famed automotive design studio Italdesign, home of Giorgetto Giugiaro, and features a similar frontal design of a BMW. It was an evolution of the BMW Nazca M12 from 1991.

History 

The Nazca project began in 1991 when the Nazca M12 was launched at the Tokyo Motor Show. The design was derived from the Bugatti ID 90 concept unveiled a year prior. The M12 was the first car designed by Giugiaro's son, Fabrizio and incorporated design elements from Group C race cars. The car achieved a drag coefficient of  when tested in the BMW windtunnel.

The car had a carbon fibre body construction also using the material for the construction of the space frame.

The engine cover and front of the car were made from a single piece of molded carbon fibre. The car had a glass engine cover which displayed the 5.0 litres V12 engine shared with the BMW 850i. The car had a unique door mechanism which had conventional doors, alongside windows which opened in a gull-wing arrangement.

A year later in 1992, the Nazca C2 was introduced. The C2 had a redesigned front (the headlamps were relocated beside of the kidney grille) and a modified engine. Italdesign had engaged the German automobile manufacturer Alpina into the project. Alpina modified the engine and as a result, the engine gained an additional . This engine was shared with the Alpina B12 5.0. Additionally, the C2 also had fixed racing seats and three spoilers at the rear to signify its race inspired status. The C2 also weighed a claimed  less than the preceding M12.

Specifications 
The engine used was a modified version of the 5.0 litres V12 used in the BMW 8 Series tuned by Alpina.

Production 
Three cars in total were produced including the M12. The car was intended as an official replacement for the BMW M1, but BMW was hesitant at producing another mid-engined sports car after the M1 had been a failure, so they did not proceed. BMW allowed ItalDesign to use their name and grille solely on the 3 concept cars built.

Nazca C2 Spider 

At the 1993 Formula One Grand Prix held in Monte Carlo, Italdesign introduced a new, slightly redesigned version of the C2 called C2 Spider. The car had removable glass panels instead of the semi-gullwing doors featured on the coupe, turning it into a roadster along with a modified engine cover. The removable parts were housed in the luggage compartment in the front of the car and could be quickly reinstalled. A roll bar in the colour of the car was fitted in order to reinforce the chassis to compensate for the loss of removable glass panels. The intake manifold of the engine was redesigned in order to allow for open air operation. The  car was fitted with a 5.6-litres V12 engine shared with the 850CSi.

References

External links 

 Italdesign: Italdesign Nazca C2.
 Italdesign: Italdesign Nazca C2 Spider.
 ConceptCarz: Italdesign Nazca C2.
 Italdesign: Italdesign Nazca M12.

Nazca C2
Italdesign concept vehicles
Sports cars